The Law Enforcement Memorial is installed on the Washington State Capitol campus in Olympia, Washington, United States. The memorial was designed by John Swanson and dedicated on May 1, 2006.

References

2006 establishments in Washington (state)
2006 sculptures
Law enforcement memorials
Monuments and memorials in Olympia, Washington
Outdoor sculptures in Olympia, Washington
Washington State Capitol campus